The No. 15 Squadron, nicknamed Cobras, is a Tactical Attack squadron of the Pakistan Air Force (PAF). The Squadron is currently based at Rafiqui Air Base and equipped with Chengdu J-10C multi role fighter jets. The squadron also carries the honour of achieving the first kill for the PAF.

History 
No. 15 Squadron was established on 05 June 1956 at PAF Base Mauripur and was designated as a tactical attack squadron.

Operational History

1959 Indian Aerial intrusion 

On 10 April 1959, while most of Pakistan was celebrating the holy day of Eid ul-Fitr, an Indian Canberra B(I)58 from the 106 Squadron entered Pakistani airspace on a photo reconnaissance mission. Two PAF F-86F Sabres (flown by Flt. Lt. M. N. Butt as the leader and Flt. Lt. M. Yunis as the wingman) from the No. 15 Squadron on Air Defence Alert were scrambled from PAF Base Peshawar to intercept the IAF aircraft. Butt attempted to bring down the Canberra by firing his Sabre's 50 cal machine guns, but the Canberra was flying at an altitude of more than 50,000 feet—beyond the operational ceiling of the F-86F. When Yunis took over from his leader, the Canberra suddenly lost height while executing a turn over Rawalpindi. Yunis then fired a burst from his F-86 (Serial# 55-005) machine guns that struck the Canberra at an altitude of 47,500 feet and brought it down over Rawat, marking the first aerial victory of the PAF. Both crew members of the IAF Canberra ejected and were captured by Pakistani authorities.

1965 War 
When hostilities broke out over the disputed Kashmir region, the No. 15 Squadron while equipped with F-86 Sabre jet fighters was deployed at PAF Base Sargodha. From there the squadron performed various combat missions including Close Air Support sorties. On 1st September, the IAF scrambled 12 De Havilland Vampire strike fighters and 14 Dassault Mystere IV fighter-bombers in an attempt to slow down the Pakistani Advance in the Chamb-Jourian sector. On the request of the Pakistan Army, two F-86 Sabres, each armed with a couple of AIM-9 Sidewinder missiles were scrambled to intercept the Indian aircraft. In the ensuing dogfight, Flight Lieutenant Imtiaz Bhatti from the No. 15 Squadron shot down two Indian Vampires over Chumb while Squadron Leader Sarfaraz Rafiqui from the No. 7 Squadron shot down another two Vampires. The remaining Indian aircraft managed to escape. This dogfight was a major blow to the Indian Air Force since it had to recall all Vampires and Mysteres from frontline service.

Soviet-Afghan War 

During the Soviet Afghan war, Soviet and Afghan warplanes would occasionally cross into Pakistani airspace while pursuing Afghan Mujahideen forces which usually resulted in Pakistani infrastructure and Afghan refugee camps getting bombed. Resultantly, the squadron was deployed at Peshawar Airbase for Air Defence Alert duties. Throughout it's service at Peshawar, the Squadron's fighters intercepted enemy warplanes only twice. First a Soviet Ilyushin Il-26 on 1st March 1980 and on the second occasion, it's fighters intercepted a couple of Mig-21s in February 1986. However on both occasions the Squadron's pilots were ordered not to engage them.

2019 Jammu and Kashmir Airstrikes 

In February 2019, the Indian Air Force bombed a wooded area in Balakot after violating Pakistan's airspace. In response, then Prime Minister Imran Khan ordered the Air Force to perform retaliatory airstrikes on Indian military installations at Indian Administered Kashmir. The retaliatory airstrikes were codenamed "Operation Swift Retort" and for this purpose Two Dassault Mirage-VPAs armed with H-4 SOW Glide bombs and two dual seat Dassault Mirage-IIIDAs from the No. 15 Squadron were deployed for this mission. In the early hours of 27 February, the No. 15 Squadron carried out the airstrikes while JF-17s and F-16s from other squadrons provided escort and CAP. The Mirage-VPAs dropped their payload while the Weapon Systems Officer seated in the Mirage-IIIDAs guided the bombs to their respective targets, However they were ordered to drop the bombs on open fields near their intended targets since the purpose of the operation was to make India aware about Pakistan's capability to strike back at any aggression. The mission was a success and all aircraft returned safely. Later, the officers from the squadron who participated in this operation including the OC received gallantry awards.

See also
 List of Pakistan Air Force squadrons
 English Electric Canberra
 No. 15 Squadron RAAF
 No. 15 Squadron RAF

References

Pakistan Air Force squadrons